William Burnett may refer to:

William Burnett (1779–1861), British physician
William Burnett (mayor), politician from New Zealand, see Mayor of Dunedin
W. R. Burnett (William Riley Burnett, 1899–1982), American novelist and screenwriter
William Burnett (preacher), president of Franklin College, New Athens, Ohio

See also
William Burnet (disambiguation)
Billy Burnette, American guitarist